Lakhan Majra is a sub tehsil of Rohtak district of Haryana state in India. It has 13 villages and 13 panchayats.

References

Cities and towns in Rohtak district